Fede is a surname, a masculine given name and a short form (hypocorism) of other given names, such as Federico. It may refer to:

Surname 
 Emilio Fede (born 1931),  Italian anchorman
 Giuseppe Fede (died 1777), Italian nobleman, collector and archaeologist
 Terrence Fede (born 1991), American football player

Given name or nickname 
 Fede Álvarez (born 1978), Uruguayan filmmaker
 Fede Álvarez (football) (born 1974), Mexican football coach
 Federico Bessone (born 1984), Argentine footballer also known as Fede Bessone
 Fernando Fede Castaños (born 1959), Spanish footballer
 Federico Fede San Emeterio (born 1997), Spanish footballer
 Fede Galizia (c. 1578–c. 1630), Italian Renaissance painter
 Federico Fede Vico (born 1994), Spanish footballer

See also 

 Fede ring, ring in which two hands meet and are clasped
 Fedde, another surname and given name
 Fed (disambiguation)
 Fedi
 Fide (disambiguation)
 Fides (disambiguation)
 Fidei (disambiguation)
 

Masculine given names
Lists of people by nickname
Hypocorisms